Lidia Guțu (born 10 August 1954, in Verejeni) is a Moldovan politician.

Biography 
She served as member of the Parliament of Moldova (2005–2006) and ambassador to Romania (2006–2009).

External links 
 Parlamentul Republicii Moldova
  List of candidates to the position of deputy in the Parliament of the Republic of Moldova for parliamentary elections of 6 March, 2005 of the Electoral Bloc “Moldova Democrata”
 List of deputies elected in the March 6 parliamentary elections
 Lista deputaţilor aleşi la 6 martie 2005 în Parlamentul Republicii Moldova

References

1954 births
Living people
Deputy Prime Ministers of Moldova
Moldovan MPs 2005–2009
Electoral Bloc Democratic Moldova MPs
Our Moldova Alliance politicians
Moldovan female MPs
Ambassadors of Moldova to Romania
Ambassadors of Moldova to Bulgaria
21st-century Moldovan women politicians
Women government ministers of Moldova
Moldovan women ambassadors